The Mary Smith House is a house on the National Register of Historic Places in Draper, Utah, United States.  It was listed in 1994.

The house was built around 1883 by Lauritz Smith for his first wife, Mary Kristine Mickelsdotter Smith, to avoid prosecution under the Edmunds Act. Since this law made "cohabitation" illegal, the theory was that if he created a new house for Mary and had his second wife Hannah in his main house he would avoid prosecution.

It is a one-story brick house built on a granite foundation.  It has a cross-wing plan and intersecting gable roofs.

References

Houses on the National Register of Historic Places in Utah
Houses in Salt Lake County, Utah
National Register of Historic Places in Salt Lake County, Utah
Buildings and structures in Draper, Utah